= Roll cast =

Type of fishing cast

The roll cast is a type of fly fishing cast that is used when a backcast cannot be carried out. It is typically used to control line slack.
